Akin Lewis (born 1957) is a Nigerian film actor, director, and producer.

Early life and career
Lewis was born on 1957 in Ibadan, Oyo State, Nigeria, and grew up in Zaria Kaduna State
He began his acting career in 1973, the same year he joined a drama group led by Professor Bode Sowande, a Nigerian writer and dramatist.
Lewis came into limelight when he played the lead role in Why Worry, a 1980 comedy sitcom on NTA Ibadan, but gained more popularity for his role as local playboy Emeka in the sitcom Koko Close. He won best actor in 1982 based on the series and national limelight in Madam Dearest, a 2005 Nigerian film produced and directed by Tade Ogidan.
Over the years, he has featured, produced and directed several films.
He featured in Tinsel, a Nigerian soap opera that began airing in August 2008 and Heroes and Zeroes, a 2010 Nigerian film written and directed by Niji Akanni.
In October 2010, he won the Audio Visual Awards (TAVA) for best actor.
He celebrated his 40th years on stage in December 2013.

Selected filmography
King of Boys: The Return of the King (2021)
The New Patriots (2020)
Soft Work (2020)
Tinsel (2008)
Heroes and Zeroes (2010)
Silver Lining (2012)

See also
 List of Nigerian film producers

References

Nigerian film producers
Nigerian screenwriters
Yoruba male actors
Male actors from Lagos
Male actors in Yoruba cinema
20th-century Nigerian male actors
21st-century Nigerian male actors
1951 births
Living people
Nigerian male television actors
Nigerian film directors